This is a list of soft drinks in order of the brand's country of origin. A soft drink is a beverage that typically contains water (often carbonated water), a sweetener and a flavoring agent. The sweetener may be sugar, high-fructose corn syrup, fruit juice, sugar substitutes (in the case of diet drinks) or some combination of these. Soft drinks may also contain caffeine, colorings, preservatives and other ingredients.

Soft drinks that are sold in more than one country are listed in this article only under their country of origin.

Algeria 

 Hamoud Boualem  – soda brand that includes many flavours
 Rouiba  – Juice brand that includes many flavours
 Tchina  – Juice- Group Cevital
 Xtra Power Energy Drink

Argentina 

 Apla
 Bidu Cola
 Cabalgata
 Chañi
 Chinchibirra
 Cunnington
 Doble Cola
 Goliat
 Manaos
 Neuss
 Pastore
 Pindy
 Pritty
 Rocket Fuel – energy drink
 Rad-60 – energy drink
 Blue Demon – energy drink
 Speed Unlimited – energy drink
 Secco (soft drink)
 Ser
 Spring Up
 Torasso
 Tradicional de Secco Secco
 Tubito
 Villa del Sur Levité

Armenia 
 Hay Cola – Armenian carbonated soft drinks with fruit flavours
 Jermuk - mineral water

Australia 

 Back o' Bourke Cordials  – Range of popular drinks including Splashe Cola sold throughout north-west New South Wales.
 BCX Royal Standard - A brand that was heavily marketed in central Victoria in the 1960s and 1970s
 Berts Soft Drinks - A "family tradition since 1893" - founded and still operated by the Shelley family, formerly of Shelleys Soft Drinks fame.  Located in Sutherland Shire, Sydney 
 Bickford's – full line of juices, sodas, teas, and bottled water
 Bundaberg – family owned producer of Bundaberg Ginger Beer
 Cascade – Quality Mixers, Soda and Cordials. Established in Tasmania, 1886.
 Cohns - Another brand popular in central Victoria in the 1960s and 1970s.
 Cooks Soft Drinks – A family owned business in Pittsworth on the Darling Downs. Producers of Cooks and Dads ranges of old style soft drinks.
 Cottee's – brand of cordial drinks, owned by previously Cadbury-Schweppes, now Schweppes Australia
 Count Cola – now discontinued brand of soda
 Crows Nest Soft Drinks – Crows Nest, just north of Toowoomba, one of the oldest in Australia, est. 1903
 Crystal – discontinued line of soft drinks, renowned for selling via their home delivery service. Later acquired by Cadbury Schweppes.
 Golden Circle – brand of carbonated beverages
 Kirks – line of sodas marketed by Coca-Cola Amatil
 Gest – line of sodas purchased by Coca-Cola Amatil and merged with Kirks
 Ladd's cordials
 LA Ice Cola – cola available in four varieties
 Leed – carbonated lemonade
 Lido
 Loys - a home delivered soft drink company, mainly in Victoria and South Australia. Incorporated into Slades.
 McSars
 McMahons soft drinks – popular family run soft drink company in Ipswich West Street, Queensland from 1934 to the late 80s, founded by Frank McMahon
 Marchants - another defunct brand of soft drinks sold in Queensland, New South Wales, Victoria and South Australia until the turn of the 21st century.
 Orfords - popular Toowoomba softdrink maker 1923–1989  – diversified into refrigerated merchandising cabinets and ceased softdrink production
 Passiona – passionfruit-flavoured soft drink available previously from Cadbury-Schweppes, now Schweppes Australia
 PipeLime
 Port Of Echuca
 Pub Squash
 Saxby's Soft Drinks - Australia's oldest family owned and operated soft drink company, based in Taree est. 1864
 Solo – lemon-flavoured drink, owned by Schweppes Australia.
 Schweppes – a range of mineral water/fruit juice drinks developed in Australia, with flavours that include orange-mango, and lemon, lime and orange.
 Shelleys – founded in Broken Hill in 1893 as a family operated soft drink company, popular in New South Wales.  Later acquired by Coca-Cola Amatil and eventually merged into the Kirks brand. The Shelley family also later founded Berts Soft Drinks
 Slades (1860–present) - Still produces a variety of niche flavours as well as contract manufacture for retailers private labels.
 Swing – Popular up until the late 1970s, Swing specialised in weekly home deliveries of glass bottles in wooden crates which are now collector's items. Used bottles were collected the following week, cleaned and reused.
 Tarax - A mainly Victorian brand that had a big presence before being merged with Schweppes. Still available as a bottom end supermarket brand.
 Weaver and Lock – Western Australian brand of soft drinks now defunct.
 Whitbreads Cordials – Charters Towers, North Queensland – Locally owned and family operated business since 1896 and still servicing North Queensland today.
 Wimmers Soft Drinks – Queensland soft drink brand owned by Noosa Beverages Pty Ltd.
 Woodroofe 'Big Sars' – Sarsparilla, Sno Top, Lemonade, Portello and a range of fruit flavours.
 YY – Local soft drink brand based in Newcastle

Austria 

 Almdudler  – an herbal soda called by some "the national drink of Austria"
 Blue Ox  – energy drink
 Frucade  – orange-flavoured soft drink
 Kracherl  – lemon or raspberry-flavoured soda
 Lattella  – whey-based line of juices available in nine flavours
 Pago
 Power Horse
 Red Bull  – popular energy drink distributed globally by Red Bull GmbH
 Red Bull Cola  – cola from Red Bull GmbH
 Rushh  – energy drink introduced in 2002 by Rushh Gmbh
 Dark Dog  – energy drink

Bahamas 
 Goombay  – locally available, champagne cola and pineapple-lemon flavoured soda
 Island Queen – locally available, coconut-infused water
 Junkanoo – locally available, lemon-lime soda produced by PepsiCo

Bangladesh 
 Akij Group
 Lemu (soft drink) – lemon-lime soda
 Mojo (soft drink) – cola drink
 Clemon – clear lime soda
 Speed – energy drink

 Pran Foods Ltd.
 Pran Up – lime soda
 Pran Maxx Cola – cola flavoured soft drink
 Pran Maxx Lemon
 Power – clear lime carbonated beverage

Globe Soft Drinks
 Uro Cola – cola
 Uro Lemon – lemon flavoured soft drink
 Uro Orange – orange soda
 Fizz up – clear lime soft drink
 Lychena – lychee flavoured soft drink
 Royal Tiger – energy drink
 Black Horse – energy drink

Barbados 
 Frutee
 Plus

Belgium 
 Frutonic – juice-like soft drink
 Nalu (drink)
 Whisky cola
 Wodka redbull
 Lipton Ice-tea (sparkling)
 Yazoo – flavoured milkshake made by FrieslandCampina
 Cécémel – flavored milk.
 Drink a Flower - Natural soft drinks

Bermuda 
 Barritt's Ginger Beer – ginger beer bottled by John Barritt & Son Ltd. since 1874

Bolivia 
 Coca Brynco – made with extracts of coca leaves

Brazil 

 CINI
 Convenção
 Dolly
 Esportivo
 Fruki
 Gengibirra – lemon and ginger soda
 Goianinho Guaraná
 Guaraná Amazônia
 Guaraná Antarctica – extremely popular guarana-flavoured soft drink, created in 1921
 Guaraná Charrua
 Guaraná Coroa
 Guaraná Jesus – guarana-flavoured soft drink, has a pink color and cinnamon aroma
 Guaraná Kuat
 Guaraná Pureza – guarana-flavoured soft drink from Leonardo Sell's company
 Guaraná Taí
 Mate Couro
 Mineirinho (soft drink)
 Primo Schincariol – line of sodas in seven flavours from Primo Schincariol
 Pepsi Antarctica
 Fruthos – brand of fruit juices in cartons from Primo Schincariol
 Guaraná Schin – guarana-flavoured soft drink from Primo Schincariol
 Itubaína – tutti-frutti soft drink from Primo Schincariol
 Skinka – energy drink from Primo Schincariol
 Sao Geraldo – caju flavoured soft drink, in Juazeiro do Norte, Ceara
 Soda Antarctica
 Sukita
 Teem
 Tubaína
 Pon Chic
 Guarapan

Bulgaria 
 Mihalkovo Mineral Water
 Airan – yogurt and water
 Hisar Mineral Water
 Altai - Tee drink
 Aspasia (soft drink)
 Etar (soft drink)

Canada 

 Bec Cola – a brand of organic cola made in Québec
 Big 8 – a brand of cola and bottled water distributed by Sobeys
 Brio Chinotto
 Bull's Head - Best known for their ginger ale. Produced in Quebec's Eastern Townships 
 Canada Dry – very popular brand of ginger ale, but many other soft drinks are available
 Canadian Gold Sparkling Waters – also available in flavours "sugar-free" bottled at source Marchand, Manitoba
 Cannonball Soda – made by Garrison Brewery
 Cott Beverages – the world's largest bottler of private label soft drinks. Once primarily known for Cott Black Cherry soda and other flavours sold under its own name. At one time used the slogan "It's Cott to be good!"
 Clearly Canadian – sparkling water available in many flavours
 Eskimo Soft Drinks – a kosher brand of soft drinks distributed by home delivery in Montreal and Toronto, through the late 1970s
 Freshie – drink mix available in 5 flavours, discontinued in the 1980s
 Ice Castle – private label soft drink brand of the defunct Steinberg's supermarket chain. Notable for selling cans without pop tops long after they became industry standard.
 K Beverages - produced in Winnipeg, Manitoba from 1941 to 1952, making fruit flavoured soda and root beer.
 KIK Cola – a now-defunct brand of cola once very popular, especially in Quebec
 Life – Shoppers Drug Mart brand
 Marco Spruce Beer
 Spruce Beer – a spruce-flavoured carbonated drink particularly popular in Quebec
 Mr. Goudas
 Pic A Pop – nostalgic brand of soda, currently available in 11 flavours made in Marchand, Manitoba since 1971
 Pop Shoppe – brand of soda available in eight flavours
 President's Choice – private label soft drinks line sold in supermarkets owned by Loblaw Companies Limited. PC Cola comes in two varieties, red label and blue label.
 Propeller Brewery – small brewery that also makes a small line of soda including Cream Soda, Ginger Beer, and Root Beer
 RELOAD – energy drink
 Red Champagne – local soft drink from Saguenay Lac-Saint-Jean, Quebec
 Seaman's Beverages - defunct company, now sold by Pepsi mostly in Prince Edward Island
 Slow Cow – an "anti-energy" drink from Slow Cow Drink Inc.
 Sussex Golden Ginger Ale – a "golden" ginger ale originally bottled in the town of Sussex, New Brunswick; sold in Canada's Maritime Provinces and northern areas in the state of Maine.
 Temagami Dry - brand Ginger Ale and Scotch Cream Soda drinks – available in Northern Ontario, named after the Temagami wilderness area in Northeastern Ontario, bottled and produced by Fortier Beverages in Cochrane, Ontario.
 TOUCH – "Sugar Free" flavoured Sparkling Mineral Water, brand owned by Canadian Gold Beverages (2012) Golden Medal best Tasting Mineral water in the World 4x times 
 Vrroom – brand of fruit flavoured sport drinks and thirst quenching slush

Chile 
 Bilz y Pap – red-colored soft drink, available in regular and diet versions
 Sorbete Letelier - local cherry-flavored soft drink. Each bottle has a natural cherry inside.

China 

 Asia - by Xiangxue Pharmaceuticals 
 Future Cola – known in China as Future Cola, marketed by the Hangzhou Wahaha Group
 Huiyuan – produced in Henan Province sold under the name Juizee Pop
 Ice Peak - produced in Xi'an city, Shaanxi province 
 Jianlibao – orange flavoured soft drink
 Laoshan Cola – produced using waters from Mt. Laoshan in Shandong province
 Nongfu Spring water - a spring water beverage based in Hangzhou in Zhejiang Province
 Smart – Coca-Cola Company; soft drinks of various fruit flavours such as apple, watermelon, grape, peach, coconut, etc.
 Wang Lao Ji – local herbal drink

Hong Kong 
 Vita Cola
 Vitasoy

Colombia 

 Colombiana – kola champagne produced by Postobon S.A.
 Cristal – bottled water and seltzer water produced by Postobon S.A.
 Gaseosas Cóndor
 Gaseosas la Cigarra – Nariño based bottling plant with famous champagne and lemonade soda.
 Gaseosas Glacial
 Gaseosas Hipinto
 Gaseosas Sol
 Hit – brand of juices marketed by Postobon S.A.
 Kola Román – red-colored soft drink
 Pony Malta – carbonated, malt beverage
 Postobón – line of carbonated drinks in five fruit flavours from Postobon S.A.
 Malta Leona

Democratic Republic of the Congo 
 Festa Soft drinks - Festa Grenadine, Festa Orange, Festa Pineapple, Festa Cola (contains extracts of coca leaves), Festa Tangawizi and Festa Lemon

Costa Rica 
 Kola Cruz Blanca – brand of cola drink
 Zarza Cruz Blanca – brand of root beer

Croatia 
 Pasareta - A mandarin-fruit punch flavoured soda bottled by Ferencić and sold in the Istrian Peninsula
 Cedevita
 Pipi - orange soda

Cuba 
 Gaseosa – lemon-lime drink by Ciego Montero
 Iron Beer
 Jupiña - pineapple soda
 Malta – drink made with malt
 TuKola – Cuban cola brand by Ciego Montero
 Materva – Cuban mate-based soft sweet drink

Czech Republic 

 Kofola – popular cola
 Semtex

Denmark 
 CULT Energy Drink
 Dansk Citronvand – carbonated lemonade
 Faxe Kondi – lemon-lime sports drink
 Jolly Cola – brand of cola founded by Dansk Coladrik in 1959
 Harboe – brand of soda with different flavours
 Maribo
 Mokai
 Nikoline appelsinvand
 Shaker – soft drink
 Somersby cider
 Squash appelsinvand
 Supermalt
 X-ray energydrink

Dominican Republic 
 Country Club
 Red Rock Cola

Ecuador 
 Fioravanti – fruity, carbonated soft drink available in strawberry or apple
 Fruit – soft drink – Famous old brand, available in many flavours, famous mascot Albertinho Dos Santos is very popular
 Frukiss Soda – limited availability, and only in the central region of Ecuador
 Jean Cola – available only in the coastal region
 Kola Gallito – very similar to the Coca-Cola-owned brand Inca Kola
 Manzana – apple flavoured sparkling soda
 Quintuples – fruit flavoured soda, available in many flavours
 Tropical (soft drink) – strawberry flavoured sparkling soda
 Orangine – blackberry juice with soda, traditional in Quito.

El Salvador 
 Kolashanpan
 Salva-Cola

Estonia 
 Blue Sheep More Hito – Lime and mint-flavoured soft drink produced by A. Le Coq with the motto Lammastele keelatud!, or Not allowed for sheep!.
 Buratino – Apple and lemon-flavoured soft drink produced by Tallinn Soft Drinks LTD Co.
 Düšess – (Duchesse) Pear and soft drink coloured with caramel and produced by Tallinn Soft Drinks LTD Co.
 Kelluke – (Campanula) Clear, lime-flavoured soft drink produced since 1965 produced by A. Le Coq, known as Tartu Eksperimentaal Õlletehas (Experimental Brewery of Tartu) back then.
 Limonaad Traditsiooniline – One of the oldest surviving soft drinks in Estonia. The recipe was composed in 1936 by Georgian Mitrofan Lagidze, and the lemonade has been produced by A. Le Coq since 1946.
 Lumivalgeke – (Snow White) Lemon and lime-flavoured soft drink produced by Tallinn Soft Drinks LTD Co.
 Mõmmi Limonaad – (Bear Cub's Lemonade)
 Punane Sõstar – (Red currant) Red currant-flavoured soft drink produced by A. Le Coq since 1969.
 Tarhun – Carbonated water mixed with tarragon-flavoured syrup invented in 1887 by Georgian Mitrofan Lagidze and produced by Tallinn Soft Drinks LTD Co.
 Valge Klaar – (White Transparent) Apple-flavoured soft drink produced by A. Le Coq since 1976.
 Hull Õun – (Crazy Apple) Apple and cola-flavoured soft drink produced by A. Le Coq since 2005, discontinued not long after and brought back in 2017.

Fiji 
 Tarumba
 Sunrise Orange drink
 Raro
 Coconut drinks
 Kava

Finland 
 Battery – energy drink marketed by Sinebrychoff
 Bratz Vadelma – raspberry flavoured Bratz-brand drink by Olvi
 Fenix – health drink brand by Hartwall
 Hyvää Päivää – health drink brand by Sinebrychoff
 Jaffa – soft drink brand sold by Hartwall since the 1940s
 La Rita – orange lemonade by Laitilan Wirvoitusjuomatehdas
 Lemona – lemonade by Laitilan Wirvoitusjuomatehdas
 Messina – blood orange lemonade by Laitilan Wirvoitusjuomatehdas
 Muumi – woodland strawberry soft drink by Sinebrychoff
 Olvi – produces Olvi Ananas (pineapple soft drink), Olvi Cola, Olvi Greippi (grapefruit soft drink), Olvi Hedelmä (mixed fruit soft drink), Olvi Jaffa (orange soft drink) and Olvi Lemon (lemon soft drink), Olvi Omena (apple soft drink)
 Omenalimonadi – apple soft drink by Hartwall
 Omenapore – remake of one of the two oldest Finnish soft drinks by Nokian Panimo
 Pirkka-cola – Kesko store brand cola
 Puolukkapore – lingonberry soft drink by Nokian Panimo
 Päärynälimonadi – pear soft drink by Hartwall
 Pommac – oak barrel maturated soft drink, first made in 1914, now by Hartwall
 Rainbow-cola – S Group store brand cola
 Rio Cola – cola by Laitilan Wirvoitusjuomatehdas
 Rio Rita – raspberry soft drink by Laitilan Wirvoitusjuomatehdas
 Sittis – remake of one of the two oldest Finnish lemonades by Nokian Panimo
 SitruunaSooda – remake of one of the two oldest Finnish lemonades by Laitilan Wirvoitusjuomatehdas
 Smurffi – pear flavoured The Smurfs-brand soft drink
 Teho – Many varieties of energy drinks.
 Turtles Päärynä – pear flavoured Turtles-brand soft drink
 Vadelmalimonadi – raspberry soft drink by Hartwall

France 
 Auvergnat cola – regional cola introduced in 2009
 Badoit – French brand of mineral water
 Breizh Cola – regionally available cola
 Cristaline – French brand of source water
 Corsica Cola – regional cola introduced in 2003
 Gini – lemon soft drink distributed by Cadbury Schweppes
 Joker – brand of juices available in many varieties
 La Mortuacienne - artisanal lemonade produced by maison Rième
 Liptonic – tea carbonated soft drink
 Lorina – fruity, carbonated soft drink available in six flavours
 Mecca-Cola – Muslim-directed cola produced by the Mecca Cola World Company
 Oasis – fruity multi flavor juices
 Orangina – orange flavoured fizzy drink
 Perrier – naturally-carbonated mineral water bottled in distinctive green bottles by the Nestlé Corporation
 Pschitt – lemon and orange soda available from the Neptune Group
 Ricqlès – mint-flavoured soft drink
 Tropico – fruity multi flavor juices. Slogan: "Quand c'est trop, c'est Tropico!"

Georgia 
 Borjomi - mineral water
 Tarhun - a Georgian Tarragon flavoured soda

Germany 
 28 BLACK – Natural Energy Drink
 Afri-Cola – cola with a high caffeine level – 25 mg/100ml
 Apfelschorle – carbonated mineral water and apple juice
 Bionade – lemonade-like non-alcoholic soft drink
 Bluna – an orange soft drink
 Brottrunk – traditional healthy beverage made from bread, much like kvass
 Capri-Sonne – many flavours of juice sold in silver pouches
 Club Cola – introduced in 1967 in East Germany
 Club Mate – Mate Tea Soda
 Dark Thunder – carbonated energy drink from Aldi
 Deit – lemonade
 Effect – energy drink
 Fanta – line of fruit-flavoured drinks, available around the world
 Fassbrause – spiced fruit-flavour soft drink
 Fritz-Kola
 Gerolsteiner – a naturally–carbonated mineral water
 Hermann-Kola – brand of cola with a high level of caffeine
 K-Fee – coffee and energy drinks
 Karamalz – caramel or lemon-flavoured soft drink
 Libella
 Mezzo Mix – orange-flavoured cola from Coca-Cola
 MioMioMate
 OstMost
 Premium-Cola – line of sodas made in protest of changes to Afri-Cola
 Red Thunder – carbonated energy drink from Aldi
 Rhino's Energy – energy drink
 Schwip Schwap a half-orange lemonade/half-cola drink by Pepsi – like Spezi
 Sprite – Coca-Cola Company
 Sinalco – lemonade
 Spezi the original half-orange lemonade/half-cola drink by Brewery Riegele
 Vita Cola – available in a Pur, Original and other flavours
 Gletscher Cola – organic and fair-trade brand of cola with raw cane sugar, guarana and herbs manufactured in Baden-Württemberg
 zX Cola – carbonated cola flavour drink from Aldi

Gibraltar 
 Brand "5" – carbonated soft drink available in raspberry and lemon flavour

Greece 
 Epsa – line of soft drinks, teas, and juices
 Three Cents – line of artisanal soft drinks
 Green Cola

Guatemala 
 Tiky

Haiti 
 Aquafine Blue Naturelle – spring water purified by reverse osmosis and ozonized by Tropic SA
 Big Shake – protein shake in Vanilla, Strawberry and Chocolate by Tropic SA
 Cola Couronne – fruit champagne by the Brasserie de la Couronne
 Cola Lacaye – available fruit champagne, banana, and fruit by the Brooklyn Bottling Group
 Crystal Sources – ozonized pure mineral water by BRANA
 Fiesta – soda available in citrus, grape and cola champagne by Tropic SA
 King Cola – available in banana, strawberry, grape, and cola champagne by BRANA
 Limonade – cola, also available in citrus flavor by the Brasserie de la Couronne
 Malta H – malt by BRANA
 Megawatt – energy drink by Tropic SA
 Ragaman – energy drink by Tropic SA
 Robusto – malt by Tropic SA
 Tampico – juice by Tropic SA
 Tampico Soda – by Tropic SA
 TORO – energy drink by BRANA
 Tropic – juice by Tropic SA
 Frucano Juice

Hungary 
 Almuska
 Bambi – oldest Hungarian brand, started in 1947. Today produced as a speciality. 
 Büki
 Deit
 Et-Üd
 Extra
 Frutti – was made by Dietrich Emil és Gottschlig József starting in 1865, with a company called DIT-GOT
 Gyöngy
 Hajdú
 Hell Energy Drink - produced in Szikszó in Borsod county.
 Hüsi
 Kati
 Márka – another product of the company that makes Traubisoda – in raspberry, sour cherry, grape and orange flavours
 Oázis
 Olympi Cola
 Olympos
 Orina – Not produced any more. Favourite of the Spanish-speaking visitors, because of the meaning of Orina in Spanish – urine
 Pataki
 Queen
 Róna – produced in three cities: Debrecen, Sopron and Csány
 Rorange
 Salgó – produced in the city of Salgótarján.
 Sárközi
 Sió
 Szivügy – It is an abbreviation for "Szénsavas Italok, Vizek és Üdítők Gyára" that means Factory of carbonated drinks, waters and refreshments. The brand was always promoted with a heart, because Szív means heart. The end of the abbreviation "ügy" means cause or matter. Szívügy = Heart cause. Not produced any more, bottles can only be found as antiques.
 Sztár – started in 1971 and produced until the early 199X
 Traubisoda – one of the most famous Hungarian brands – grape flavour
 Utas
 Viking
 Vita Cola
 Vitis
 Zselic – produced in Kaposvár, regional small company
 Xixo – iced tea, lemonade and flavoured mineral water, produced in Hell Energy's factory.

Honduras 

 Copan Dry

Iceland 
 Appelsín – orange soda
 Malt Extrakt
 Mix
 Orka

India 
 Appy – apple-flavoured drink by Parle Agro
 Appy Fizz – sparkling apple drink by Parle Agro
 Aquavida – by Secure Beverages Industries Private Limited
 Artos – regional soft drink from Andhra Pradesh available in grape, orange, lemon and carbonated water
 Fanta – orange-flavoured soft drink
 Bisleri Pop – flavours: Spyci, Piña Colada, Fonzo and Limonata
 Bindu Soda
 Boss Cola
 Bovonto – grape soda produced by Kali Mark
 Cafe Cuba – coffee flavoured fizzy drink by Parle Agro
 Catch Clear - flavoured, diet, carbonated water by DS Group
 Catch Jira - fizzy jeera (cumin) drink by DS Group
 Catch Juice Beverages - Ready to serve/drink juice-based and pulp-based beverages by DS Group. Available in 10 flavours - Strawberry, Sweet Lime, Orange, Mango, Fresh Lime, Lychee, Apple, Guava, Pink Lemonade and Multifruit.
 Catch Shikanji Masala - fizzy lemon and jeera (cumin) drink by DS Group
 Catch Spring Cola - fizzy cola drink by DS Group
 Catch Spring Lemon - fizzy lemon drink by DS Group
 Catch Spring Orange - fizzy orange drink by DS Group
 Catch Sprint-up - fizzy lemony drink by DS Group
 Campa Cola – popular Indian soda first introduced in 1977. Acquired by Reliance Retail in 2022. 
 Citra
 Chinar fruit beer – apple flavoured fruit beer, non alcoholic
 Cloud 9 – energy drink
 Coca-Cola — Non alcoholic drink from Coca-Cola
 Coke Diet – Non alcoholic drink from Coca-Cola
 Code Red – energy drink
 Delhi-Daredevils – energy drink
 Del Monte fruit drinks
 Duke's Lemonade
 Duke's Mangola – mango drink from Dukes bought by PepsiCo
 Frams  – local drink from Pune
 Foozy- sugar cane juice
 Frooti – mango-flavoured drink from Parle Agro
 Fruit Jump – mango Drink from Om Food Products
 Gluco Cola - cola drink by Parle, discontinued in 1951, under pressure from Coca-Cola
 Guruji Products - Traditional Indian drinks
 Ganga Sagar – Local drink of Haryana
 Gold Spot – orange flavoured carbonated drink
 Grappo Fizz – Grape-flavoured drink from Parle Agro
  Guptas – soft drinks introduced in 1947 in eight flavours
  h2o – carbonated water
 Juicila – powdered soft drink concentrate available in orange, mango, lemon, cola, masala, jaljira
 Jumpin – mango flavoured drink from Godrej Group
 Joy
 Kalimark
 Kickapoo
 Lava Cold Drink
 Limca – lemon flavoured soda
 Liyo – One of the popular soft drink brands in Delhi & NCR.
 LMN – lemon drink produced by Parle Agro
 Maaza – mango drink from Parle Bisleri bought by Coca-Cola
 Mahaajan Beverages – carbonated Kokum drink
 Mirinda – brand of fruity sodas in nine flavours distributed
 Mishrambu-  Badam Thandai Dry Fruit Concentrate. Badam Thandai Dry Fruit Sharbat
 Mountain Dew
 Nimbooz – lemon flavoured drink by PepsiCo India.
 Pallonji – Flavoured soda mainly sold in Mumbai, established in 1865
 Paneer Soda – lemon soda in the states of Tamil Nadu and Andhra Pradesh
 Paper Boat – Traditional Indian drink concoctions, produced by Hector Beverages Pvt Ltd in Gurgaon
 Rasna – powdered fruit flavoured, ready to mix drink. Available in orange, mango, lemon, grape and many other flavours
 RC Cola
 Rooh Afza – popular juice produced by Hamdard Laboratories
 Sailor - Carbonated drink produced in Gujarat-western state of India by Aims Beverages.
 Sosyo – Sosyo is an Indian aerated drink, produced and marketed mainly in the western states of India by Hajoori and Sons, Surat.
 Sprite
 Tata Gluco+ – A drink from Tata – orange flavoured carbonated drink
  Tropicana
 Tnga – energy drink
 Urzza – Energy drink by Bisleri
 Xalta - Carbonated drinks, carbonated fruit drinks, still fruit drinks from Xalta Food and Beverages Pvt. Limited, New Delhi
 Xtra Power E Drink – Universal Group
 XXX – Energy drink
 X.ray — Energy drink
 Zaffa
 Hood Frucano shreevari

Indonesia 
 AdeS – brand of fruit juice
 F&N
 Fruity powder drink – pop drink product by Forisa Nusapersada
 Green Sands
 Hemaviton
 M150
 Nutrisari
 Piaw A&W Root Beer
 Sunkist
 Teh Botol Sosro
 Sarsi - Sarsapilla
 Badak
 temulawak Agung Ngoro
 Coffee Beer Agung Ngoro

Iran 
 Aab Zereshk – a traditional drink made of soaked dried berberis in cold water
 AshiMashi – soda available in three flavours from the AshiMashi Group
 Delester A non-alcoholic beer that can come malt.
 Doogh – traditional yogurt-based beverage
 Istak A non-alcoholic beer that can come in many flavours such as green apple, raspberry, and melon.
 Khiss Kardeh, – khiseh or Aab Kardeh – Old traditional drink for winter time, extracted from soaked dried fruits including sour cherries, apricot, prune, peach and fig in cold water
 Koohrang – mineral water from Lake Shalamazar bottled by the AshiMashi Group
 Parsi Cola – produced by the Sasan Company
 Shadnoush – orange and lemon soda produced by the Sasan Company
 Sharbat – all different sorts, mostly made of cooked sugar + water, together with some sort of fruit for taste and aroma. Traditional sharbats include: Sharbat-e sekanjabin– cooked vinegar, sugar & mint, Sharbat-e beh limoo– quince, lime & sugar, Sharbat-e aab limoo – lime juice & sugar, Sharbat-e albaloo – sour cherry & sugar, Sharbat-e zaafaroon – saffron & sugar.
 Sherkat alice
 Tops
 Ushkaya – hardnes:42, produced by the Kosarnosh Kandovan Company
 Zamzam Cola

Ireland 
 BPM Energy
 Brown lemonade – popular lemonade variety in Ulster
 Cavan Cola – locally popular soft drink discontinued in 2001
 Cidona – apple-flavoured soft drink
 Club Orange
 Club Lemon
 Club Rock Shandy
 Club Shandy, discontinued 0.5% alc
 Country Spring
 Finches
 JaffO Juice Super Juice
 Lucozade Energy
 Maine Soft Drinks Ltd - based in Ballymoney, County Antrim
 McDaid's Football Special - now made by Maine Soft Drinks for James McDaid & Sons Ltd..
 MiWadi
 Red lemonade – traditional variant of lemonade
 Score
 Sports Special
 Tanora
 Tipperary Clearly
 TK

Israel 

 Growper - Organic carbonated soft drink
 Kristal
 Prigat – brand of juices available in 16 countries from Gat Foods
 Rozina's
 Spring
 Super Drink
 Tapuzina
 Tempo
 Zip
 Island
 Fuze tea

Italy 

 Brio Chinotto – A bitter tasting carbonated cola similar in flavor to tonic water
 Beverly – a bitter-tasting, carbonated drink from Coca-Cola
 Cedrata – Citron limonade
 Chinotto – traditional Italian cola made with the chinotto fruit
 Cupido Drink – represent the House of Romeo and Juliet in Verona, Italy. claimed to be the only soft drink that contains more fruit juice than a natural Juice 130% – produced by El Badaoui Group srl, Milano
 Crodino – non-alcoholic aperitif distributed by the Campari Group
 Crodo – large line of mineral water, soda, juice, and iced tea distributed by the Campari Group
 Estathe produced by ferrero spa
 Lemonsoda – lemon-flavoured soda, along with Oransoda and Pelmosoda, distributed by the Campari Group
 San Benedetto - produces mineral water and soft drinks
 Limonata
 Sanbittèr San Pellegrino
 Sanbittèr Dry colourless carbonated non-alcoholic aperitif
 Stappj produced by diorio spa
 Sterilgarda – Company natural fruit juices are served in Neos flights
 Gassosa – sweetened carbonated water
 Spuma

Jamaica 

 Bigga – brand of carbonated soft drinks in various flavours
 Old Jamaica Ginger Beer
 Sorrel
 Ting

Japan

Carbonated 
 Asahi Soft Drinks
 Bubble Man – soft drink marketed by the Suntory Group, many varieties
 Calpis Soda – a carbonated variant of the Calpis drink listed below
 C.C. Lemon – marketed by Suntory, third most popular soda in Japan
 Chanmery – non alcoholic wine substitute
 Cheerio (drink) – brand of soda produced by the Cheerio Corporation, many flavours
 Hoppy (drink) – non-alcoholic beer substitute
 Ito En Fruits Soda
 Kirin Lemon
 Match (drink) – fruity soda with lemon and grapefruit flavors
 Mitsuya Cider – brand of sodas available in six flavours from Asahi Soft Drinks
 Oronamin C Drink – carbonated health drink produced by Otsuka Pharmaceutical Company
 Ramune – soda which comes in many flavors known for its unique bottle
 Sangaria
 Real Gold – carbonated energy drink from Coca-Cola

Coffee 
 Boss Coffee – wide variety of coffee beverages
 Fire
 Georgia – coffee-flavoured beverages sold by Coca-Cola
 Latte Latte
 Pokka Coffee – Milk coffee drinks from Pokka Sapporo
 Roots
 Wonda

Non-carbonated 
 Amino-Value
 Bikkle - a popular yogurt-based drink
 C 1000 Lemon Water – A vitamin drink from the C 1000 pharmaceutical company, also in jelly form
 Calpis – a concentrated soft drink, also available in diluted and carbonated forms and in many flavours
 Hot Lemon – a hot winter drink usually served out of vending machines and convenience stores
 Jūrokucha – blend of 16 teas, available decaffeinated
 Lemongina – a sour lemon variant on the popular French soda Orangina
 Momo no Ten-nen sui
 Natchan! – an orange-flavored juice drink from Suntory
 Nectar – a peach flavored juicy drink from Fujiya
 Oi Ocha – a popular tea drink from Ito En
 Qoo – fruity soft drink in a variety of flavours from Coca-Cola
 Salt & Fruit – a fruity soft drink with lychee and berry flavors
 Vita 500

Sports drink 
 Aquarius – grapefruit-flavoured sports drink
 Dakara
 Lipovitan – energy drink first released in the 1960s
 Pocari Sweat – soft drink produced by Otsuka Pharmaceutical Company

Kosovo 
Golden Eagle, an energy drink

Kuwait 
 Arabian Beverage Company – ABC – Nutritional range of beverages
 Kuwola, by Kuwait beverages limited

Lebanon 
 Bonjus – line of beverages produced in Lebanon by a company of the same name. The company was founded in 1962,
 Fridge – a brand name of a carbonated juice manufactured by Drinko s.a.r.l.
 Jalloul – old brand of soft drink
 Kazouza 1941 – Kazouza 1941 is the nostalgic, yet renewed, Lebanese product/brand with varied and innovative flavors and a unique bottle shape differentiating it from available products in the market.
 Najem – old brand of Lebanese soft drink and producer of Kazouza 1941
 Freez – a line of fruit flavored soft drinks produced by Chateau Ka

Libya 
 Judi – fruit juices
 Nabe – Bin Ghashir
 Zain – Ghuneim Juice Production - Benghazi

Lithuania 
 Buratinas
 Diušes – a pear flavour soft drink
 Frisco – soda, distributed by the Coca-Cola Company, available in many artificial flavours
 Gira – a traditional Slavic, Baltic and Germanic beverage, made from fermented rye bread – crusts or malted rye extract, yeast and sugar
 Selita – various carbonated and still soft drinks – also with juices maker and brand
 Tarchunas

Discontinued Soviet-era drinks – circa 1980–1990 
 Apelsinas
 Bachmaro
 Baikalas
 Fiesta – a lemon flavour tonic water
 Mandarinas
 Sajanai
 Svaja – a carrot flavour original soft drink with sediments
 Šaltukas
 Varpelis
 Vėsa – a strong specific flavour apple with mint drink

Madagascar 
 BonBon Anglais

Malaysia 
 100plus – brand of isotonic energy drink byFraser and Neave
 Kickapoo
 Fruit Tree by Fraser and Neave
 Ice Mountain by Fraser and Neave
 Seasons by Fraser and Neave
 Leema by Cinqasa
 Yeo's
 Freedom Cola – cola in 2-varieties produced by Yeo's
 H-Two-O – line of sports drinks sold by Yeo's
 Justea – line of iced teas in 6-flavours produced by Yeo's
 Soyrich – brand of soymilk available in 5-flavours produced by Yeo's

Maldives 
 Three Choice – formerly known as Don Don, sold in various flavours including cola flavour, apple, grape and cherry

Malta 
 Kinnie – bitter, amber-colored soda
 Krest – orange-flavoured soda produced by Coca-Cola

Mauritius 
 Cidona – apple-flavoured soft drink

Mexico 
 Ameyal – brand of fruit sodas available in 8 flavours
 BEAT – citrus-flavoured soda from Coca-Cola
 Chaparritas – variously flavoured soft drinks in small bottles
 Ciel – bottled water distributed by Coca-Cola, also available in Angola and Morocco
 Coyame – sparkling mineral water, certificate from UNAM, born in the mineral springs from Catemaco, Veracruz
 Escuis – many varieties of fruit-flavoured soft drinks, founded in 1912
 Jarritos – lightly carbonated brand of soft drinks, available in twelve flavours
 Joya – brand of fruit sodas available in eight flavours from the Coca-Cola Company
 Lulu – carbonated soft drinks, available in various flavors
 Manzana Lift – line of apple-flavoured sodas available in five varieties from Coca-Cola
 Manzanita Deliciosa – flavoured apple soda, from Toluca México traditional with Mexican food, since 56 years ago
 Manzanita Sol – apple-flavoured beverages distributed by PepsiCo
 Pascual Boing – large line of carbonated and non-carbonated soft drinks in many flavours
 Peñafiel – mineral water available in three varieties from Cadbury-Schweppes
 Sangria Señorial – sangria-flavoured, non-alcoholic beverage
 Sangria Topochico – sangria
 Sidral Mundet – apple soft drink
 Toni Col – vanilla flavoured soft drink
 Topo chico – mineral water bottled in Monterrey
 Whopperán – gooseberry flavoured soft drink
 Yoli – lime flavoured, from the state of Guerrero
 Zaraza – commercially available as recently as 1986 in Veracruz

Morocco 
 Cool – range of soft drinks made from concentrated fruit juices
 Hawai – carbonated soft drink, available in pineapple and tropical flavours.
 Poms – apple flavoured carbonated soft drink
 Top's – soft drink in various flavours
 Vimto
 Seven up (Original-Mojito)
 Evervess
 Mirinda (Orange-Lemon)
 Orangina
 Rani
 Royal Club
 Guarana Antarctica

Myanmar 
 Minute Maid Nutriboost
 Mirinda
 Blue Mountain
 Star Cola
 Max Plus
 Max
 Ve Ve
 Rocker

Netherlands 
 AA Drink
 Royal Club
 Dr. Foots
 3ES
 Sisi

New Zealand 
 Foxton Fizz – soda, available in many flavours
 Fresh Up - made by Frucor-Suntory Beverages
 Höpt – carbonated, non-alcoholic hop-based soda with additional flavours
 Lemon & Paeroa
 Petes Lemonade – local brand, founded in Nelson, 8 flavours
 Wests – local brand similar to Schweppes found mainly in the South Island, includes a wide range of sugar free, is New Zealand's oldest continuous manufacturer of soft drinks
 Chi - carbonated herbal soft drink
 Endeavour Mixers 
 Illicit cola

Norway 
 Julebrus – Type of soda sold around Christmas, many varieties and brands
 Eventyrbrus – carbonated red-coloured drink
 Farris – mineral water, bottled since 1907
 Ingefærøl – ginger ale
 Isklar – pure glacier mineral water, still and sparkling
 Mozell – apple and grape flavoured soda
 Solo – orange flavoured, also other varieties, lemon, guava
 Tab X-Tra – Sugar free cola drink
 Urge – Predecessor and Norwegian version of the Surge soda from Coca-Cola
 Urge Intense – Energy drink sold under the Urge brand
 Villa – mixed fruits, formerly known as Villa Farris
 Voss – mineral water, still and carbonated
 Vørterøl - carbonated maltbeverage
 OskarSylte Owner of solo and oldest soft drink in Norway

Oman 
 Quwat Jabal – lemon-lime soda from Coca-Cola

Pakistan 

 Best – Best Foods
 Apple Sidra
 Candia – Haleeb
 FRESHER Fresh juices, Pomegranate, Guava, peach, strawberry– www.al-hilal.com.pk/
 Fruit-a-Vitals – Nestle
 Gold Sip Nectar Juices by – Azam Food
 Gourmet Cola – cola
 Kooler Apple, Grape, Lime, Malt, Cocktail, Saudi Champagne – www.al-hilal.com.pk/
 Makkah Cola
 Malt – orange, lemon, peach
 Murree Brewery – apple, lemonade
 Nooras
 Pakola – line of fruit-flavoured sodas from Mehran Bottlers Ltd and Gul Bottlers – Pvt Ltd.
 Power – Energy drink
 Rooh Afza – popular juice produced by Hamdard Laboratories
 Shezan International – Fruit Juices
 Shakarganj Food Products Ltd – Any Time Juices in mango, orange, peach and apple flavors
 Shandy Cola
 Mashmoom - Food & Beverages (Juices, Water, Ketchup, Jams stc)
 Shark – energy drink
 Sting – energy drink
 Xtreme
 Zamzam Cola
 Next Cola

Papua New Guinea 
 GoGo Cola – produced by Pacific Industries in Rabaul.
 Gold Spot – A range of soft drinks produced by Pacific Industries.

Paraguay 
 Pulp
 Simba (soft drink)
 Terere
 Mate Cocido
 Cachaza
 Clerico
 Chicha
 Niko Soft Drink

Peru 
 Beed Cola – brand of soft drinks produced in Pucallpa
 Cassinelli – brand of soft drinks produced by Enrique Cassinelli and Sons
 Concordia – brand of soda available in many fruit flavours, produced by PepsiCo
 Energina- yellow soft drink produced by Socosani
 Fuji-Cola – created to support Alberto Fujimori's bid for President of Peru
 Guaraná (Backus) – soft drink produced by Backus and Johnston
 Inca Kola – yellow soda that tastes like bubble gum produced by Corporación José R. Lindley S.A.
 Isaac Kola – yellow soft drink created by Embotelladora Don Jorge S.A.C. to compete with Inca Kola and Oro
 Kola Escocesa – red soft drink available in several varieties
 Kola Inglesa – red, cherry-flavoured soda
 Kola Real – fruit-flavoured soda available in five flavours
 Oro – yellow soda produced by Ajegroup to compete with Inca Kola
 Perú Cola – brand of sodas in four flavours produced by Embotelladora Don Jorge S.A.C.
 Triple Kola – produced by PepsiCo and sold in Peru, it is similar to Inca Kola.
 Viva – similar to Inca Kola produced by Backus and Johnston

Philippines

Carbonated soft drinks 
 Jaz Cola – locally available cola from Coca-Cola
 Lemo-Lime
 Mirinda
 Pop Cola – distributed by Coca-Cola
 Juicy Lemon – distributed by ARC Refreshments Corporation
 Fruit Soda Orange – distributed by ARC Refreshments Corporation
 Seetrus – distributed by ARC Refreshments Corporation
 Arcy's Root Beer – distributed by ARC Refreshments Corporation
 Royal
 San Mig Cola
 Sarsi – a Sarsaparilla rootbeer originally made by Cosmos Bottling, now part of Coca-Cola
 Sparkle
 Twist – lemon-lime soda, from the Zest-O Corporation
 Zest-O Calamansi Soda
 Zest-O Dalandan Soda
 Zest-O Cola
 Zest-O Rootbeer

Energy drinks 
 Blue Men
 C4
 Cobra – produced by Asia Brewery
 Extra Joss – powdered energy drink
 I-On by Revicon
 Sting Energy Drink – manufactured by the Pepsi Corporation
 Vault
 Monster Energy
 CULT
 Rockstar
 Bacchus
 Black Mamba
 Lobo
 Samurai - manufactured by the Coca-Cola Corporation but discontinued in 2010s
 Thunder Super Soda - manufactured by the Coca-Cola Corporation. launched in 2018

Juice drinks 
 BIG 250 – line of juices available in six flavours, from the Zest-O Corporation
 Drinky
 Eight O'Clock – powdered juice beverage
 Fres-C – powdered drink mix available in three flavours
 Funchum
 Jungle Juice
 Magnolia Fruit Drinks
 Mix Frutz – by Innobev, Inc.
 One Plus – line of iced teas available in nine flavours, from the Zest-O Corporation
 Orchard Fresh – line of bottled juices available in seven flavours, from the Zest-O Corporation
 Plus!
 Ponkana
 Refresh
 Sundays – made by snack foods giant Liwayway Marketing Corp.
 Sunkist – available in tetrahedral packs, Tetra packs, doy packs and powdered juice forms.
 Sunglo – line of juices and powdered juices available in seven flavours, from the Zest-O Corporation
 Zest-O – popular line of juices available in twelve flavours, from the Zest-O Corporation

Poland

Carbonated soft drinks 
 3 Cytryny, 3 Pomarańcze, 3 Witaminy... – by ZbyszkoCompany Sp. z o.o.
 Ariva Ice Tea – by ZbyszkoCompany Sp. z o.o.
 Black – by FoodCare.
 Chai Kola, Chai Mate – by Wild Grass
 Cola Original Zero – by Kantpol-Żywiecki Kryształ
 Freeway Cola Light – by Lidl
 Frugo – by FoodCare.
 Hallo Cola – by Wosana S.A. Butternut squash juice.
 Hoop Cola – by Hoop Company which also produce Original Cola for Biedronka supermarkets chain and Strong Cola for E.Leclerc hypermarket chain and also Hoop Citrus Ice, Hoop Czarna Porzeczka, Hoop Fruti, Hoop Limonka, Hoop Pomarańcza, Hoop Tonic, Hoop Podpiwek Staropolski, Hoop Kwas Chlebowy.
 Koral Ekipa – by Krynica Vitamin SA
 Lemo – by HOOP Polska
 Lemoniada – by Hellena
 Lemoniada – by Tymbark / Maspex Wadowice
 Matrix energy drink – by ZbyszkoCompany Sp. z o.o.
 Napoje gazowane: Limonka, Pomarańcza, Cytryna – by Hellena
 Next – by Tymbark
 Oranżada – by Hellena
 Polo-Cockta – by Zbyszko Company Sp. z o.o.
 Tęczowa Cola – by P.P.H FARPOL
 Tiger Energy Drink – by Maspex Wadowice
 Tonik – by Hellena
 Vega – by Tymbark
 Yerba Mate Rainbow – by Wild Grass

Portugal 
 Atlântida – brand of flavoured water
 Besteiros - orange, lemon or pineapple flavored soft drink
 Brisa – brand of soft drinks marketed on Madeira Island
 Bussaco
 BriSol
 Frisumo
 Frutis
 IKA
 Kima – brand of soft drinks marketed in the Azores
 Laranjada – orange soda produced since 1872
 Snappy
 SUCOL – less sugar, more freshness
 Sumol + Compal

Puerto Rico (U.S.) 
 Coco Rico – coconut-flavored soft drink
 Kola Champagne – despite a name that suggests an alcoholic drink, Kola Champagne is actually a soft drink
 Limonada Santurce Soda Water – lemon-lime soda
 Malta India – malt beverage
 Old Colony – grape and pineapple varieties
 Piña colada. The national drink.

Romania 
 Adria - line of carbonated soft-drinks made by European Foods and Drinks
 Borsec – mineral water bottled by the Romaqua Group S.A.
 Boza
 Brifcor – carbonated, orange-flavoured beverage produced by the Romaqua Group S.A.
 Bucovina – mineral water
 Burn – international energy drink
 Cappy – natural fruit juice
 Carpatina – mineral water
 Compot
 Dorna – mineral water
 Frutti Fresh – line of fruit-flavoured sodas available in six flavours
 Giusto – line of sodas in nine flavours from the Romaqua Group S.A.
 Izvorul Alb
 Natura – line of juices in five flavours from the Romaqua Group S.A.
 Quick Cola – cola distributed by the Romaqua Group S.A.
 Socată
 Stânceni – seltzer mineral water produced by the Romaqua Group S.A.

Russia 
 Baikal – drink 
 Buratino – a  flavoured soda
 Dyushes –  a pear-flavoured soda
 Elbrus – Natural mineral waters and soft drinks
 Kvass – traditional Slavic beverage made from fermented bread
 NiCola
 Ochakovskiy
 Russkiy dar
 Khlebnyy kray
 Kruzhka i bochka
 Marengo – drinks brand
 Napitki iz CernoGolovki - Juices

Serbia

Carbonated 
 Knjaz Miloš – brand of bottled water, fruit juices, soda, and an energy drink
 Na eks
 Feshta
 Frutella
 Alpina

Non-carbonated 
 Fruvita
 Next
 Nectar
 Swisslion

Energy Drinks 
 Booster
 Guarana
 Doctor Night
 After Party
 Excess
 Fast Energy Drink

Singapore

Carbonated 
 235 energy drink
 Anything
 F&N
 Joe Drink
 Kickapoo
 Naughty G series
 POP
 Shark
 Oldenlandia Water

Non-carbonated 
 Pokka
 Lemon and Kalamansi
 Pink Dolphin
 Seasons
 Whatever

Sports drink 
 100 Plus – lightly carbonated sports drinks from Fraser and Neave, Limited (F&N)
 Sportade
 H-Two-O (H2O)

Slovakia 
 Kofola
 Vinea

Slovenia 
 Cockta
 Jupi
 Donat Mg
 Ora
 Stil

South Africa 
 Appletiser – apple, pear, and grape-flavoured carbonated soft drinks
 Bashew's – carbonated soft drinks since 1899
 Iron Brew
 King Cola – carbonated cola soft drink
 Kingsley – carbonated soft drinks since 2006
 King Malta – carbonated dark malt drink
 Mirinda
 Schweppes Sparkling Granadilla Twist – carbonated soft drinks – passion fruit flavour
 Soda King – carbonated soft drinks
 Soraya Apple Malt – carbonated apple flavoured malt drink
 Sparletta Creme Soda – carbonated soft drinks – green in colour and a more 'floral' flavour than white cream soda
 Stoney Ginger Beer – carbonated soft drinks
 Twizza – carbonated soft drinks 
 Refreshhh! – carbonated soft drinks and energy drinks

South Korea 
 Bacchus-F – non-carbonated energy drink by the Dong-A Corporation
 Cham Doo – cereal drink made from 15 grains produced by Lotte Chilsung
 Chilsung Cider – colorless, lemon-lime soda produced by Lotte Chilsung
 Coco – coconut-flavoured juice bottled by the OKF Corporation
 Da Jun Moon
 Dynamic – energy drink produced by Lotte Chilsung
 Ginseng Up – ginseng-infused health drink produced by Ilhwa Company Ltd.
 Hi-Sec – grape and orange juices with fruit pieces distributed by Ilhwa Company Ltd.
 Hong Gee Won – juice made from the Yong-Gee mushroom, produced by Ilhwa Company Ltd.
 Hyeonmi Cha – made from roasted brown rice and sweeteners
 ILAC – carbonated jelly drink and line of juices produced by Lotte Chilsung
 Mega Vita
 Millennium McCol – cola made from barley, produced by Ilhwa Company Ltd.
 Milkis – carbonated milk in five flavors produced by Lotte Chilsung, available internationally
 Misofiber – apple-flavoured fiber drink produced by Ilhwa Company Ltd.
 Natural Soda – mineral-rich soft drink produced by Ilhwa Company Ltd.
 Pine Bud – pine leaf extract beverage produced by Lotte Chilsung
 Richard's Cafe – pre-made coffee available in 6 flavours from the OKF Corporation
 Sac's – three flavours of fruit juices produced by the OKF Corporation
 Sikhe – traditional drink made from fermented rice produced by Lotte Chilsung
 Sparkling – flavoured water available in 8 flavours from the OKF Corporation
 Today's Tea – brand of teas in many flavours distributed by Lotte Chilsung
 Vita 500
 Vita Power – vitamin drink, available in two varieties, produced by Lotte Chilsung
 Volcano – energy drink produced by the OKF Corporation

Spain 
 Chupa Chups soft drinks
 Clipper – strawberry soda brand from Gran Canaria, that sells only in Canary islands. It actually has a Wikipedia page, but just in its Spanish version.
 Kas – fruit-flavoured, carbonated beverage brand, now owned by PepsiCo
 La Casera – brand of soda marketed by Orangina Schweppes
 Mare Rosso – bitter soft drink marketed by Coca-Cola
 Mirinda – brand of fruity sodas in nine flavours distributed by PepsiCo
 Trina – formerly "Trinaranjus", non-carbonated soft drinks distributed by Orangina 
 Missile Energy drink
 Urban is a brand with several flavours of soft drinks (most notably cola) produced by the Firgas bottled water company, out of Gran Canaria, and sold mainly in Canary Islands.
 Duk is a soft drink from the island of La Palma, which has several flavor variants.

Sri Lanka 
 Baby Brand
 Elephant House Cream Soda – The Most Popular
 Elephant House Lemonade
 Elephant House Necto
 Elephant House Orange Barley
 Elephant House Orange Crush
 Elephant House Soda
 Elephant House Tonic
 Elephant House Bitter Lemon
 Elephant House Apple Soda
 Elephant House Ginger Beer (EGB)
 Elephant House Dry Ginger Ale
 Elephant House KIK Cola
 Elephant House Twistee Apple
 Elephant House Twistee Peach
 Mirinda
 Mountain Dew
 My Cola
 My Orange
 My Lemon
 My Cream Soda
 Ole Arshik
 Ole Cream Soda
 Ole Ginger Beer
 Ole Zingo
 Shaa Cola
 Shaa Mandarin
 Shaa Orange
 Shaa Lemon
 Sprite

Suriname 
 Fernandes – soft drink

Mineral water 
 Aqua Kristall
 Basic One – sourced in Zanderij, Suriname
 Diamond Blue-Made by Rudisa beverages
 Para springs – sourced in Amazon rainforest fresh water resources, Suriname
MORE juices-made by Rudisa Beverages
Basic One bottled water
Wahaha bottled water

Sweden 
 Alla tiders
 Apotekarnes Cola
 Borddricka – traditional soft drink, with a taste of portello and julmust
 Champis – began production under this name in 1918
 Citronil – traditional soft drink
 Cuba Cola – brand of cola marketed by Saturnus AB since 1953
 Dansk Citron – bright yellow lemon-flavoured soft drink
 Drink 21 – cola mixed with julmust
 Enbärsdricka – traditional, sweet soft drink
 Frank's Energy and Sports Drink – energy drink brewed by Kopparbergs
 Fruktsoda – lemon-lime soda
 Fun light – sugarfree drink
 Grappo – grape-fruit soda
 Green cow – energy drink which is an obvious parody of Red Bull. Created as an advertisement for Hammarby IF
 Guldus – apple soda
 Haiwa – pineapple soda
 Hallonsoda – raspberry soda
 Jaffa – soft drinks with a taste of orange
 Julmust – traditional Christmas-season drink
 Kitty Kola – cola-flavoured soft drink
 Loranga – orangeade
 M.A.C. Black Cola
 Merry – luxurious lemon/lime drink no longer in stock
 Nexcite – an energy drink meant to promote the female libido, from Nexcite AB
 Pommac – secret recipe including 25 varieties of fruit, oak barrel maturated, one of Sweden's oldest sparkling soft drinks
 Portello – red peculiar soft drink from northern Sweden, similar to but not identical with the British Portello soft drink
 Påskmust – more or less identical to Julmust but sold at Easter
 Päronsoda – pear soda
 Rio – Blood orange
 Siddni – soft drink with taste of passion fruit
 Sockerdricka – traditional sweet-sour soft drink
 Svagdricka – traditional stout-like soft drink similar to Kvass
 Syd – orangeade
 Trocadero – Soft drink with a taste of orange and apple juice
 Vira Blåtira – bright blue tutti frutti soda
 Zingo – Soft drinks with a taste of orange, pineapple/orange or melon/lemon.

Non-carbonated 
 Festis
 MER
 Smil

Sports Drinks 
 Pripps Energy
 White Tiger
 Nocco
 Celsius
 Gatorade

Switzerland 
 Baerg Goggi - discontinued cola drink
 Elmer Citro - lemonade
 Flauder - carbonated mineral water with an elderflower and lemon balm flavor
 Gazosa
 Goba Cola
 Gretchen Cola
 Happy Cola - cola in various flavors from the Coop supermarket chain
 Kult Ice Tea – ice tea manufactured by Migros
 M-Budget – low price drink line by Migros including Citron, Orange, Grapefruit and Cola. Every flavour includes a "zero" variant
 Mojo - sparkling fruit drink in different flavors
 Nycha Kombucha - drink with fermented green tea
 Passaia – passion fruit soda from Rivella SA
 Pepita – carbonated grapefruit lemonade, also available with orange, or lemon flavours.
 Ramseier - apple juice and apple cider drinks
 Rivella – milk plasma-based soft drink available in five variants (classic, green tea, sugarfree, peach, rhubarb) from Rivella SA
 Vivi Kola - cola drink produced since 1938
 Nestea

Taiwan

Carbonated drinks 
 Apple Sidra
 HeySong Sarsaparilla
 Vitaly

Non-carbonated drinks 
 Cha Li Wang – various flavours of sweetened and unsweetened tea

Sports drinks 
 Super Supau

Thailand 
 Est Cola
 Green Spot – non-carbonated orange soft drink

Energy Drinks 
 M-150
 Krating Daeng
 Carabao Daeng

Togo 
 Cocktail de Fruit
 Singha

Trinidad and Tobago 

 Angostura LLB (Lemon Lime and Bitters)
 Busta
 Cannings – brand of soft drinks owned by Coca-Cola, available in many fruit flavours
 Chubby
 Cydrax
Ginseng UP
 Mauby Fizz – cola produced from mauby bark
 Peardrax
 RC Cola
 Shandy Carib (different flavors)
 Solo Apple J
 Solo Bentley
 Solo Ginger Beer
 Solo Juices (different flavors)
 Solo Orange J
 Solo Pear J
 Solo Soft Drinks (different flavors, such as banana, kola champagne, and cream soda)
 Solo Sorrel
 Sorell Fizz
 Upper 10
 Viva

Tunisia 
 Boga – introduced in 1947, with 4 different flavors
 Cider Meddeb
 Fayrouz
 Danao
 Delice –  brand of Danon company
 Oh!
 Pétillante Sabrine (exist in 5 different flavors)
 Freez
 Tropico
 Coca-Cola 
 Délio
 Viva 
 Raouaa 
 Diva 
 Florida
 Fourat

Turkey 
 7 Gün
 Ayran - Saltish yoghurt drink
 Boza - A slightly fermented drink
 Cola Turka – brand of cola, advertised by Chevy Chase
 Elvan
 Şalgam
 Şıra - Slightly fermented grape juice
 Uludağ Gazoz – 'fruit flavoured' – founded in 1930, in Bursa – also sold extensively in Germany
 KIZILAY MADEN SUYU - KIZILAY MINERAL WATER

Ukraine 
 Revo

United Arab Emirates 
 Alokozay 
 Dubai Cola - cola flavored with dates
 Canada Dry - Cream Soda, Cola and Dana are the most common flavors sold in UAE
 Green Cola - Stevia sweetened soft drinks with cola, cherry, lemonade and orange flavors
 O - locally manufactured as a low cost alternative to Pepsi and Coca-Cola, comes in cola, berries, lemon and orange flavors
 Power Plus – brand of energy drinks available in five flavours from ZamZam Refreshment
 RC
 Star - a local soft drink brand that comes in many flavors
 Thums Up 
 Zamzam – brand of sodas and bottle water from Zamzam Refreshment

United Kingdom 

 Amé
 Barr – brand of Scottish company A.G. Barr – range of drinks includes American Cream Soda, Cola, Red Kola, Ginger Beer, Lemonade, Pineapple, Limeade and Orangeade and of course the world-famous Irn-Bru
 Barley water – popular drink made from boiling barley
 Bing – a dark orange soft drink produced by the Silver Spring Mineral Water Company
 Bitter Shandy
 Black Sun Energy drink
 Boost – energy drink
 Bouvrage – a juice soft drink, made with raspberries or blueberries
 Cocofina – a natural coconut water and three flavoured coconut waters mixed with juices
 Classic Cola – brand of cola
 Cresta – discontinued fruit-flavoured "frothy" soft drinks manufactured by Schweppes
 Dandelion and burdock – traditional soft drink made from fermented dandelion and burdock
 Emerge – energy drink manufactured by Cott
 Energizer Brands – energy drink manufacturer
 Evoca Cola – soda made with black seed extract
 Evoid Drinks – brand of fruit juices with no added sugars, preservatives, or other additives
 Explosade – carbonated soft drink
 Feel Good Drinks Co – brand of juices, now sold in 14 countries
 Fentiman's Botanically Brewed Beverages – including traditional ginger beer; Victorian lemonade; curiosity cola; dandelion & burdock; brewed shandy; mandarin & seville orange jigger tonic water & rose lemonade
 Firefly Tonics – line of fruit juices with herbal extracts
 Folkington's - premium fruit juices, sparkling presses and mixers
 Fruit Shoot – brand of juice drinks from Britvic available in 5 flavours
 Ginger beer – originated in the 18th century
Gunna Drinks - a range of craft soft drinks with 5 unique flavours. 
 Innocent Smoothies – 100% fruit smoothies and fruit juices
 Irn-Bru – orange-coloured citrus soft drink from Scotland and very popular there; produced by A.G. Barr
 J2O – soft drink made from fruit juices, produced by Britvic
 KA
 Kia-Ora – line of fruit juices available in 4 flavours
 Levi Roots Drinks - exotic fruity soft drinks in a range of flavours
 Lilt – fruity soda available in three flavours
 Lucozade – energy drinks of several varieties, a former GlaxoSmithKline brand, now produced by Suntory
 Lurvills Delight – discontinued soda
 Luscombe Organic Drinks – hand crafted organic adult soft drinks including Hot Ginger Beer, Elderflower Bubbly, Sicilian Lemonade, Raspberry Crush, Apple & Ginger, Orange Juice, St Clements, Apple & Pear Juice, Devon Apple Juice.
 Maine – line of sodas, cordials, and seltzers from Maine Soft Drinks Ltd.
 Panda Pops – soft fizzy drinks in a range of flavours.
 Prime Hydration - fruity energy drink created by KSI and Logan Paul, available in various flavours.
 Purdey's – energy drink in two variants made by Orchid Drinks Ltd.
 Qibla Cola – cola from the Qibla Cola Company
 Quatro – soda from Coca-Cola
 R. White's Lemonade – carbonated lemonade distributed by Britvic
 Red Kola – fruity soft drink from A.G. Barr plc
 Red Rooster – mixed fruit-flavoured energy drink produced by the Cott company
 Relentless – particularly sweet energy drink from Coca-Cola
 Ribena – brand of fruity soft drinks available in many flavours from GlaxoSmithKline, now produced by Suntory
 Robinsons – brand of soft drinks available in many flavours of cordial and flavoured water from Britvic.
 Rola Cola – cola distributed worldwide by Dubuis & Rowsell
 Rubicon, exotic fruit drinks produced by subsidiary of A.G. Barr
 Rubicon Raw Energy - fruity energy drink version of Rubicon
 Schweppes
 Tango – originally an orange flavour soft drink, now a range of drinks including Tango Orange and Tango Apple, produced by Britvic
 Tizer, produced by A.G. Barr
 Tonic water – Carbonated water flavoured with quinine
 Twiss
 Vimto and Vimto Cherry
 Viva Drinks – A range of functional drinks made with a blend of fruit juices, water & botanicals

Mineral water 
 Buxton Mineral Water – sourced in Buxton, England
 Harrogate Spa Water – sourced in Harrogate, England
 Highland Spring – produced in Blackford, Perth and Kinross, Scotland
 Malvern Water – sourced in Colwall in the Malvern Hills, England
 Strathmore Water – sourced in Strathmore, Scotland and bottled in Forfar by A.G. Barr
 Willow Water – sourced in the Lake District

United States (mainland) 

 7 Up – licensed by Dr Pepper/Seven Up to local bottlers
 Ale-8-One – a ginger-and-fruit drink distributed mostly in Kentucky
 Amp Energy – an energy drink from PepsiCo
 Aquafina – bottled water distributed by PepsiCo
 Arizona – mostly iced teas, marketed in distinctive tall, 23-oz. cans
 A-Treat
 A&W Root Beer and A&W cream soda – licensed by Dr Pepper/Seven Up to local bottlers
 Bawls
 Barton Springs Soda Co
 Barq's – the only major American root beer with caffeine.
Big Ben's - Catawissa Bottling Company - line of soft drinks. Known for their Blue Birch Beer. Sold in Northeastern Pennsylvania.
 Big K – line of soft drinks – Sold at Kroger family of stores
 Big Red
 Blenheim Ginger Ale – a particularly strong ginger ale, bottled by Blenheim Bottlers
 Boylan Bottling Company – a variety of sodas such as Birch beer and Root beer.
 Bubble Up – lemon-lime soda, similar to 7 up, produced by Monarch Beverage Company
 Buffalo Rock Ginger Ale – a dark-colored ginger ale produced by Buffalo Rock Company – mainly distributed in the southeastern states
 Burn Energy Drink, owned by Monster beverage corporation
 Bruce Cost Ginger Ale – line of ginger ales produced by BCGA Concept Corp with fresh ginger instead of extracts or other flavorings
 C & C Cola – a cola brand distributed as a regular grocery item rather than stocked by the bottling company's local drivers
 Cactus Cooler – licensed by Dr Pepper/Seven Up to local bottlers
 Cannonborough Beverage Company – Handcrafted artisan fresh fruit sodas
 Cheerwine – cherry flavored drink – mainly North Carolina and Virginia
 Chek – line of soft drinks – affiliated with Winn-Dixie
 Chicago Root Beer – line of root beer associated under the Cool Mountain Beverages brand
 Chucker – discontinued line of flavored soda formerly made in Connellsville, Pennsylvania
 Coca-Cola – cola - licensed by the Coca-Cola Company
 
 Cool Mountain Beverages
 Country Time – licensed by Dr Pepper/Seven Up to local bottlers
 Crush – Dr Pepper/Seven Up
 Dad's Root Beer – Monarch Beverage Company, Atlanta, GA
 Delaware Punch – grape-flavored, non-carbonated, limited availability
 Diet Rite – diet cola licensed by Dr Pepper/Seven Up R.C. unit to local bottlers
 dnL – caffeinated lemon-lime soda similar to Mountain Dew, from Dr Pepper/Seven Up
 Double Cola – regional cola brand based in Chattanooga, Tennessee
 Dr. Brown's – A popular brand of root beer and cream soda in the New York City region
 Dr Enuf – vitamin-fortified lemon-lime drink available in northeast Tennessee, parts of Florida, and possibly elsewhere
 Dr Pepper – large international beverage company, founded in 1885
 Egg cream – type of fountain drink that originated in Brooklyn
 Faygo – line of soft drinks
 Fitz's – root beer and other classic sodas bottled in a microbrewery/restaurant in St. Louis, MO, distributed to certain grocery stores around the country
 Foxon Park – Connecticut based soda company distributing real cane sugar sodas throughout the U.S. Favorites include Birch Beer, Root Beer and many others
 Fresca – grapefruit soda marketed by the Coca-Cola Company
 Frostie – root beer, cream, and fruit-flavored sodas
 Frostop – root beer and cream soda
 Guarana Brazilia – guarana based soda made in New Jersey by Crystal Beverage Corp.
 Grapico – Grape soft drink primarily available in Alabama
 Gray's – line of soft drinks
 Green River – lime-flavored soft drink
 Hansen's – soft drinks, natural juices, energy drinks
 Hawaiian Punch – licensed by Dr Pepper/Seven Up to local bottlers
 Hires Root Beer – licensed by Dr Pepper/Seven Up to local bottlers
 Hyvee – only marketed in the midwest
 IBC Root Beer – 11 flavors, owned by Dr Pepper/Seven Up/Snapple group
 Iron Beer – Formerly the National Beverage of Cuba, this beverage is consumed mainly by Cubans in Florida, and has been around since 1917. A rare product to find, No longer produced in Cuba, only found in Florida.
 Izze – natural flavored fruit drinks, multiple flavors
 Jolly Good – numerous flavors including cola, lemon lime, orange, grape, pina colada, black cherry etc.
 Jolt Cola – made with double caffeine, hence the "jolt" name
 Jones Soda – made with pure cane sugar and known for odd flavors including "candy corn" for Halloween and "turkey and dressing" for Thanksgiving
 Josta first US energy drink, aka Josta with Guarana
 
 Kist – orange soda, later other flavors
 Kutztown Soda Works Sarsaparilla

 Loganberry – dark purple, non-carbonated, berry-flavored drink with no juice content and most commonly available under the Crystal Beach and Aunt Rosie's brand names; available in and around Buffalo, NY
 
 Marengo – Iced Coffee Drinks
 Manhattan Special – espresso soda
 Mary Jane's Relaxing Soda
 Minute Maid – soft drink only – licensed by The Coca-Cola Company
 Mirinda – multi-flavored fruit sodas
 Mello Yello – lemon-lime, similar to Mountain Dew – The Coca-Cola Company
 Mountain Dew – licensed by PepsiCo
 Moxie – the first American mass-produced soft drink, primarily available in New England and Pennsylvania
 Mug Root Beer – licensed by PepsiCo
 Nehi – Dr Pepper/Seven Up
 Nesbitt's – Retro Orange Soda
 Northern Neck Ginger Ale – Central/Eastern Virginia
 OK Soda – a discontinued test drink from The Coca-Cola Company with a small cult following
 
 Old Orchard – line of juices
 Old Town – line of soft drinks
 Orange Whip – defunct fountain beverage
 Original New York Seltzer - variety of flavors produced from 1981 until 1994, then revived in 2015.
 Orbitz – soft drink
 Patriot's Choice – Cola
 Pepsi – cola - licensed by PepsiCo
 Pibb Xtra – formerly known as Mr. Pibb – Coca-Cola Company

 Point Premium Root Beer – Sold primarily in Wisconsin – Stevens Point Brewery
 Polar – Line of soft-drinks primarily sold in New England
 Pupiña Soda – Variety of flavors including Pineapple, Raaid
 R.C. Cola – Cola – licensed by Dr Pepper/Seven Up to local bottlers
 Red Rock Cola
 RESQ – energy drink
 Refresco Goya – Goya Foods line of soft drinks for the US Hispanic market
 Route 66 Sodas, LLC – produces a variety including Route 66 Route Beer, Orange, Lime and Cream Soda.
 R.W. Knudsen Family
 Safeway Select – Safeway brand drink
 Sam's Choice – Wal-Mart brand drink
 Sarsaparilla soda – Traditional soft drink
 Schweppes Ginger Ale – licensed by Dr Pepper/Seven Up to local bottlers
 Shasta – Cola plus dozens of other flavors
 Sierra Mist – lemon-lime, similar to 7 up and Sprite – PepsiCo (discontinued in 2023)
 Ski – made by Double-Cola co. Mainly in western Ky. similar to Mountain Dew.
 Slice – orange soft drink – PepsiCo
 Sour Power – sold only on tap in bars primarily for mixing cocktails – Coca-Cola Company
 Sprecher Brewery – traditional beverages
 Sprite – a clear, caffeine-free lemon-lime flavored soft drink made by the Coca-Cola Company first introduced in West Germany in 1959 as Fanta Klare Zitrone (Clear Lemon Fanta), it was introduced in the United States in 1961
 Squirt – licensed by Dr Pepper/Seven Up to local bottlers
 Starry – lemon-lime, similar to 7 up and Sprite – PepsiCo
 Stewart's Fountain Classics
 Sun Drop – licensed by Dr Pepper/Seven Up to local bottlers
 Sunkist – licensed by Dr Pepper/Seven Up to local bottlers
 Sunny Select – sold at Save Mart Supermarkets/Lucky – No. Cal/Food Maxx/Food Source
 SunnyD – licensed by Dr Pepper/Seven Up to local bottlers
 Surge – a citrus soda brought back after being discontinued – Coca-Cola Company
 Tab – licensed by The Coca-Cola Company
 Teem Soda
 Top Pop Soda – line of soft drinks
 Towne Club – Detroit-based line of inexpensive soft drinks
 treetop
 Vault – licensed by The Coca-Cola Company
 Vess – a line of soft drinks primarily available in the Greater St. Louis area
 Vernors Ginger Ale – the first American soft drink, licensed by Dr Pepper/Seven Up to local bottlers, primarily available in Michigan
 Welch's – licensed by Dr Pepper/Seven Up to local bottlers
 White Rock – traditional beverages
 WPOP – Wegmans Brand90 traditional beverages

Uruguay 
 Paso de los Toros – brand of tonic water and fruit-flavoured soft drinks from PepsiCo

Vanuatu 
 Lava Cola – soft drink containing kava extracts, marketed for its relaxing properties and described as an "anti-energy drink"

Venezuela 
 Frescolita – cream soda-type drink
 Hit – carbonated soft drink available in 6 fruit flavours
 Papelón con limón – traditional drink made from papelón, water, and lemon or lime juice
 Glup - Caffeinated beverage with sugar, and flavors

Vietnam 
 Xá xị Chương Dương - sarsaparilla flavored soda 
 Soda kem - cream soda drinks sold under several brands such as Mirinda
 Number One Cola

Yemen 
 shani  - berry flavored soft drink

Zimbabwe 

 Blue mountain juices – natural juices made in the Eastern Highlands of Zimbabwe available in orange, passion fruit and mango
 Carimba – carbonated soft drink available in three fruit flavours
 Cascade – fruit drinks made by Lyons a subsidiary of Dairibord Holdings Limited
 Chibuku – traditional sorghum beer
 Mahewu/Mageu – a very popular traditional sorghum malt drink made by Makonde industries
 Mazoe – concentrated juice from the Mazowe Citrus available in orange raspberry and cream soda – green
 Quench – fruit juice made by Dairibord holdings

See also 
 Craft soda
 List of citrus soft drinks
 List of lemon-lime soda brands
 List of national drinks
 List of soft drink producers

References 

Lists of brand name drinks
Lists of drinks